Those Country Kids is a 1914 American short comedy film starring Fatty Arbuckle and Mabel Normand, and directed by Fatty Arbuckle.

Cast
In alphabetical order:
 Roscoe 'Fatty' Arbuckle
 Gordon Griffith
 Billy Jacobs
 Mabel Normand
 Al St. John
 Josef Swickard

See also
 List of American films of 1914
 Fatty Arbuckle filmography

References

External links

1914 films
Films directed by Roscoe Arbuckle
Silent American comedy films
1914 comedy films
1914 short films
American silent short films
American black-and-white films
American comedy short films
1910s American films